Pallipattu  is one of the revenue village in Cuddalore district of Indian state, Tamil Nadu.

External links 
 Official website of Tamil Nadu
 Government of Tamil Nadu

References 

Villages in Cuddalore district
Cities and villages in Cuddalore taluk